The Minnesota Ovarian Cancer Alliance (MOCA) is an organization for women with ovarian cancer in the state of Minnesota. The organization raises public awareness of ovarian cancer and helps to fund medical research. MOCA was established in 1999.

References 

Ovarian cancer
Non-profit organizations based in Minnesota